Gotskalk Mathiassen Seim (1818 – 1873) was a Norwegian politician.

He was elected to the Norwegian Parliament in 1862, 1865 and 1868, representing the constituency of Søndre Bergenhus Amt. He worked as a farmer there.

References

1818 births
1873 deaths
Members of the Storting
Hordaland politicians
People from Voss